Haru Wazaki (1 February 1885 – 30 December 1952) was a Japanese politician. She was one of the first group of women elected to the House of Representatives in 1946.

Biography
Born in Akita in 1885, Wazaki was educated at Akita Girls' High School, graduating in 1904. She then attended the Tokyo Girls' Music School. During her studies she married an army officer, Toyoyuki Wazaki. Following his death, she returned to Akita, where she initially worked as a masseuse, before opening a hair salon. She also became an agent of the Akita branch of the New Japan Women's Society.

Wazaki contested the 1946 general elections as an independent candidate in Akita, and was elected to the House of Representatives. She lost her seat in the 1947 elections after unsuccessfully running in Akita's first district. She was a Democratic Party candidate in the 1949 elections, but was again unsuccessful. She died in 1952.

References

1885 births
People from Akita (city)
Japanese hairdressers
Members of the House of Representatives (Japan)
1952 deaths
20th-century Japanese politicians
20th-century Japanese women politicians